Amy Banarsie (born 12 September 2000) is a footballer who plays as a forward for Dutch Eredivisie club VV Alkmaar. Born in the Netherlands, she represents Suriname at international level.

Club career
Banarsie has played for PEC Zwolle in the Netherlands.

International career
Banarsie was capped for Suriname at senior level during the 2022 CONCACAF W Championship qualification.

International goals
Scores and results list Suriname goal tally first

References

External links

2000 births
Living people
People with acquired Surinamese citizenship
Surinamese women's footballers
Women's association football midfielders
Suriname women's international footballers
People from Steenwijkerland
Footballers from Overijssel
Dutch women's footballers
PEC Zwolle (women) players
Eredivisie (women) players
Dutch sportspeople of Surinamese descent